Pinhole  may refer to:
 Pinhole (optics), a small hole used as an optical aperture
 Pinhole (band), a rock band from Liverpool, England, later to become The Dead 60s
 Pinhole (song), a song by Japanese rock band Ogre You Asshole
 Firewall pinhole, in computer networking, a port that is opened through a firewall for a particular application